American Society of Travel Advisors (abbreviated as ASTA) is a trade association which was formed to represent and defend the business and regulatory public policy interests of travel intermediaries, including travel agencies (including traditional "brick and mortar" agencies, online portals, mega- and corporate agencies, and small and mid-market businesses) and tour providers (including wholesalers and operators). The headquarters of the American Society of Travel Advisors is in Alexandria, Virginia, United States; it is a US Internal Revenue Service 501(c)(6) tax-exempt not-for-profit entity.

Its members include travel agents, intermediaries, and supplier companies who offer travel products and services such as tours, cruises, hotels, destinations, tourist bureaus, ground transport, car rentals, local guides and hosts.  ASTA aims to act as an advocate for travel advisors (also known as "travel agents"), the travel industry and the traveling public.

History
The American Society of Travel Advisors (ASTA) was founded on April 20, 1931, in New York City as the American Steamship and Tourist Agents Association. ASTA changed its name to the American Society of Travel Agents in 1944. On January 26, 2000, ASTA acquired the assets of The National Association of Commissioned Travel Agents, Inc. (NACTA) which is now a membership subsidiary, called National Association of Career Travel Agents since 2009.  NACTA represents independent travel agents, cruise-oriented agents, home-based travel agents and outside sales travel agents. On August 28, 2018, the organization was renamed to the American Society of Travel Advisors.

ASTA supported the Travel Promotion, Enhancement, and Modernization Act of 2014 Act (H.R. 4450; 113th Congress), a bill that would extend the provisions of the Travel Promotion Act of 2009, which established the Corporation for Travel Promotion (also known as Brand USA), through September 30, 2020, and impose new performance and procurement requirements on the corporation. ASTA President Zane Kerby said that the bill "is essential to marketing the United States as a desirable destination for international tourists, conferences and business."

Executive Committee, Board of Directors
ASTA maintains an Executive Committee to handle most association decisions.

2018-2019 Executive Committee
 Zane Kerby, President & CEO, Alexandria VA
Dave Hershberger, President, Prestige Travel Inc./Travel Leaders, Cincinnati OH (Chairman)
 Eric Maryanov, President, All-Travel, Los Angeles CA (Vice Chairman and Secretary)
 Steve Powers, President, Hidden Treasure Tours, New Lebanon NY (Treasurer & Area Director, East Region)
 Denise Jackson, President & CEO, Balboa Travel Inc., San Diego CA (CAC Chair)

2018-2019 Board of Directors
 Rick Ardis, Ardis Travel, East Rutherford NJ (elected to second term)
 Brian Chapin, Ensemble Travel Group, Chicago IL (newly elected, serving 1-year term)
 Betsy Geiser, Uniglobe Travel Center, Irvine CA (elected to second term)
 Toni Lanotte-Day, Toni Tours Inc., Levittown NY (completing final year of term)
 Olga Ramudo, Express Travel, Miami FL (elected to second term)
 Patty Thorington, Plaza Travel, Encino CA (newly elected)
 Michael Dixon, Travelink/American Express, Nashville TN (CAC Vice Chair)
 Helen Prochilo, Promal Vacations, Long Beach NY (NACTA/ASTA Small Business Network Member) (elected to second term)
 Cheryl Bunker, Virtuoso, Fort Worth TX (Consortium Member)
 Laura Rodriguez, Marina Tours and Travel Arizona LLC, Phoenix AZ (Area Director, West Region) (elected to second term)
 Chris Seddelmeyer, Seddelmeyer Travel Concepts, Lima OH (Area Director, Central Region) (elected to second term)

Membership
Most members are based in the USA. ASTA is organized under New York State Corporation Law but located in Virginia, just outside Washington DC, to assist in its government and industry affairs.

Voting members are only US-domiciled Travel Agent Members and Premium Members. According to ASTA bylaws (last revised in August 2018), ASTA has thirteen membership categories:

Travel Agency Member (also known as Core Member)
Travel Agency Employee Member
Non-Affiliated Member
Premium Agency Member
Consortium Member
Premium Agency Employee Member
International Travel Agency Company Member
International Travel Associate Member
Allied Company Member
Allied Associate Member
Travel School Member
Honorary Member
Independent Contractor Member

See also
 Airlines Reporting Corporation (ARC)
 International Air Transport Association (IATA)
 International Association of Travel Agents Network (IATAN)
 United States Tour Operators Association (USTOA)
 Pacific Asia Travel Association (PATA)

References

External links
 
TravelSense.org – ASTA's Consumer website
 Complaints About Travel Agents or Travel Agencies - USA.gov
 Travel Agents: Their Role and Liability - American Bar Association, June 29, 2017

Non-profit organizations based in Alexandria, Virginia
Organizations established in 1931
Trade associations based in the United States
Traveling business organizations
Travel-related organizations